Gordon Lindemann (1921 – June 10, 2017) was an American sailor, In 1967, he was the 5.5 Metre World Champion. Along the way there were many Soling victories, including Kiel Week.

In the early days of the Soling class Lindeman, the head of the United States Soling Association (U.S.S.A.) technical committee, worked out the details for Soling builders to insure that each hull conforms to the same rigid standard all over the world.

References

External links
 

1921 births
2017 deaths
American male sailors (sport)
Soling class sailors
5.5 Metre class sailors
World Champions in 5.5 Metre
World champions in sailing for the United States